Homeless for the Holidays is a 2009 Christian-Christmas film by Breathe Motion Pictures. The film was directed by George A. Johnson, who previously directed Dreamer: The Movie. Shooting began on April 18, 2009, in Fort Wayne, Indiana. In January 2010, it was released theatrically for a limited time, including a special screening sponsored by The Dove Foundation at Celebration! Cinema in Grand Rapids, Michigan.

Plot
Jack Baker is a self-made executive who lives an upper-middle-class life–until he loses his job, and finds himself working at a burger restaurant to make ends meet. To make things worse, ends are not being met, and, if something doesn't change soon, his family could lose everything by Christmas.

Cast
Matt Moore as Jack Baker
Crystal Dewitt-Hinkle as Sheryl Baker
Cole Brandenberger as Adam Baker
Gabrielle Phillips as Michelle Baker
Brad Stine as a Supermarket Manager
David Sisco as Wesley

See also
 List of Christmas films

References

External links
 Official website
 
 Homeless for the Holidays at The New York Times

2009 films
Films about evangelicalism
American Christmas drama films
2000s Christmas drama films
Films shot in Indiana
2009 drama films
2000s English-language films
2000s American films